Miley Memorial Field , formerly known as Big Piney-Marbleton Airport, is a public airport located three miles (5 km) north of Big Piney and two miles (3 km) north of Marbleton, both towns in Sublette County, Wyoming, United States. It is owned by the Big Piney-Marbleton Airport Board.

Facilities and aircraft 
For the 12-month period ending May 31, 2019, the airport had 2,544 aircraft operations, an average of 7 per day: 98% general aviation, 1% air taxi and <1% military. There werew 10 single engine aircraft based at the airport.

References

External links 

Airports in Wyoming
Buildings and structures in Sublette County, Wyoming
Transportation in Sublette County, Wyoming